This is a list of Inferno programs. Most of these programs are very similar to the Plan 9 applications or UNIX programs with the same name.

System software

General user 
dd – convert and copy a file
date – print the date
echo – print arguments
emu – Inferno emulator
mash – programmable shell
ns – display current namespace
 – build Inferno namespace
os – interface to host OS commands (hosted Inferno only)
plumb – send message to plumber
plumber – plumber for interapplication message routing
rcmd – remote command execution
runas – run command as another user
sh – command language
tiny/sh – reduced command line interface to the Inferno system
wm/logon – log on to Inferno
wm/sh, wm/mash – Window frames for the Inferno shells
wm/wm – window manager

System Management

Processes and tasks management 
time – time command execution
kill, broke – terminate processes
sleep, pause – suspend execution for an interval
ps – process (thread) status
wm/task – graphical task manager

User management and support 
auth/passwd – change user password
man, wm/man, man2txt, lookman – print or find manual pages

Files and Text

Filesystem Utilities 
chgrp – change file's group or owner
chmod – change file mode (permissions)
cp, fcp – copy files
du – disk usage
lc – list files in columns
ls – list files
mkdir – make a directory
mv – move files
bind, mount, unmount – change name space
pwd – working directory
rm – remove files
touch – update the modification time of one or more files

Archivers and compression 
ar – archive maintainer
gettar, lstar, puttar – tar archive utilities
gzip, gunzip – compression and decompression utilities

Text Processing 
cat – concatenate files
cmp – compare two files
diff – differential file comparator
fmt – simple text formatter
freq – print histogram of character frequencies
grep – pattern matching
p – paginate
read – read from standard input with optional seek
tail – deliver the last part of a file
tcs – translate character sets
tr – translate characters
wc – count lines, words, and characters

Editors 
acme, win – interactive text windows, and an editor environment
wm/brutus – screen editor with support for SGML
vixen – a vi clone
wm/edit – simple graphical text editor

Communication, networking and remote access 
telnet – make a remote telnet connection
collab/connect – connect to collaborative files and services
collab/chat, collab/poll, collab/poller, collab/whiteboard – collaborative activities
cpu – execute a remote command
wm/dmview, wm/dmwm – view remote displays
wm/vncv – a VNC remote access tool 
netstat – summarize network connections
sendmail – send mail messages
listen, styxlisten, dial – network connections

Grid computing 
grid/localreg – starts a registry on the local machine
grid/srv/monitor – graphical display for viewing resource use.
grid/srv/ns, grid/runns – exports a selected namespace and serves it on stdin.
grid/query – graphical interface to view resources registered with a known registry
grid/register – registers a resource with a known registry

Security
crypt, auth/aescbc – data encryption
auth/secstore – retrieve files from secure store
auth/factotum, auth/feedkey – authentication agent
idea – encrypt/decrypt a file with the IDEA cipher
netkey – calculate response to authentication challenge

Programming tools 
asm, disdump – Assembler, Disassembler
cprof, wm/cprof – coverage profiling of Limbo programs
disdep – print load dependencies for Dis file
wm/deb – graphical Limbo debugger
limbo – Limbo compiler
mk – maintain (make) related files
mprof, wm/mprof – memory profiling Limbo programs
prof, wm/prof – profiling Limbo programs
stack – examine call stack
yacc – yet another compiler-compiler (Limbo version)
tclsh – a tcl implementation.
 – an implementation of the git version control system.

Application software

Web browsers
charon – web browser
webgrab – fetch web page content as files

Desktop Publishing 
cook – SGML converter
ebook/ebook – Open Ebook browser

Graphics and multimedia 
 – basic audio output and conversion
wm/view – picture viewer
bolgia – an enhanced version of "view" picture viewer

Various utilities and games 
cal – print calendar
wm/calendar – print upcoming events
fortune – sample lines from a file
wm/memory – memory monitor
wm/about, wm/clock, wm/coffee, wm/colors, wm/date, wm/man, wm/polyhedra, wm/reversi, wm/rt, wm/stopwatch, wm/sweeper, wm/tetris, wm/unibrowse, wm/vt, wm/winctl – miscellaneous graphical applications

Inferno applications
Inferno applications
Inferno applications
Inferno (operating system)